Dobwalls and Trewidland is a former civil parish in south-east Cornwall, England, United Kingdom.

The parish was bounded to the north by St Neot and St Cleer parishes, to the east by Liskeard and Menheniot parishes, to the south by Morval parish, to the west by the East Looe River and the parishes of St Pinnock and St Keyne, and to the south-west by Duloe parish.

The two largest villages in the parish were Dobwalls  and Doublebois , both in the north of the parish. There were several smaller villages in the south of the parish including Trewidland and Horningtops, and the hamlet of Boduel to the north. The hamlets of Coombe, East Tuelmenna, Treburgie and Twelvewoods were also in the parish.

The ancient village of Dobwalls was originally in Liskeard parish until the separate civil parish of Dobwalls and Trewidland was created. The population of Dobwalls and Trewidland parish in the 2001 census was 1,939  including Hendrabridge plus Looe Mills and  increasing to 2,068 at the 2011 Census.

Protected areas
Rosenun Lane, 1 km north of St Keyne Wishing Well Halt railway station, is a designated Site of Special Scientific Interest noted for its geological characteristics.

Ward changes
In 2002, the Electoral Commission ordered a re-organisation of wards in Caradon. The former wards were abolished and the district was divided into twenty-two new wards; and the parish of Liskeard was divided into two parish wards, Liskeard North and Liskeard South.

The change created 'Dobwalls and District' as a ward electing two councillors and incorporating the parishes of Dobwalls and Trewidland, Morval, St Keyne and St Pinnock.

In 2020 Cornwall Council announced that from 1 April 2021 the part of Dobwalls and Trewidland parish surrounding the village of Trewidland would be moved to the parish of St Keyne, to form the new parish of St Keyne and Trewidland, with the remaining parish known as Dobwalls.

References

External links

Former civil parishes in Cornwall